Charm "Shuffle" Chiteule (10 October 1953 – 6 May 2008), born in Kabwe was a Zambian professional feather/super featherweight boxer of the 1970s and '80s who won the Zambia featherweight title, and Commonwealth featherweight title, and was a challenger for the United States Boxing Association (USBA) super featherweight title against Refugio Rojas, his professional fighting weight varied from , i.e. featherweight to , i.e. super featherweight, he died of malaria in Kabwe Mine Hospital. Charm Chiteule was the President of the Zambia Boxing Federation (ZABF), and was awarded The President’s Insignia for Meritorious Achievement by Zambian President Levy Mwanawasa as part of the Zambian Independence celebrations on 24 October 2007.

References

External links

Image - Charm Chiteule
Levy Mourns Boxer Charm Chiteule

1953 births
2008 deaths
Deaths from malaria
Super-featherweight boxers
Featherweight boxers
People from Kabwe District
Zambian male boxers